Green Hedges was a house that was the home of Enid Blyton home from 1938 until near her death. She wrote most of her books there and it was the location of her famous Story Parties. The house was situated off Penn Road in Beaconsfield, Buckinghamshire.

History
In 1938, Enid Blyton and her first husband Hugh Alexander Pollock moved to the eight-bedroomed, mock-Tudor mansion where she would live for the rest of her life. There were large lawns, tennis courts, and a rose garden. There was also a large porch at the side.

After
After Enid Blyton's death the house was knocked down and new houses were built in its place. A road named Blyton Close stands in the approximate location of the house.

References

Enid Blyton
Houses in Buckinghamshire
Beaconsfield